Checkmate was an Indian Bengali television thriller series which aired on Star Jalsha from 21 January 2012 to 15 June 2012.

Plot 
The show was basically a thriller, where the main protagonist was detective Mrinalini Dastidar (played by Aparajita Ghosh Das). She along with her associates used to solve the mysteries.

Cast 
 Saurabh Chatterjee as Amolendu Dostidar
 Aparajita Ghosh Das as Detective Mrinalini Dostidar 
 Amitabh Bhattacharjee as Aditya Sen
 Suchismita Chowdhury as Aporna
 Rupa Bhattacharya as ACP Sreeja Sen
 Rimjhim Mitra as ACP Sreeja Sen
 Rajanya Mitra as Esha
 Indrani Basu as Mira
 Kaushik Bhattacharya as Hirok
 Somjita Bhattacharya as Madhuja's Friend
 Jayanta Dutta Burman as Derek
 Anindya Chakraborty as Kaushik Mukherjee
 Soma Banerjee as Anjalimashi
 Saheb Chatterjee as Rohit (Goenda Keutey)
 Swaralipi Chatterjee as Ritu
 Biplab Dasgupta as OC Dutta
 Gautam Dey as Adheer Sinha
 Kaushik Ghosh as Amit Lahiri
 Rajesh Kr Chattopadhyay as Sanjoy
 Ratna Ghoshal as Sanjoy's Mother
 Jagannath as Amitabha Choudhury 
 Ekavali Khanna as Avantika (2 episodes, 2012)
 Anusuya Majumdar as Julia Aunty
 Samrat Mukherjee as Barun Sen
 Sudip Mukherjee as Neel Roy Burman
 Pushpita Mukhopadhyay as Protima 
 Saptarshi Ray as Akash
 Sayantani Sengupta as Anita
 Soumyo as Joy
 Zoyeb as Imon
 Aparna as Ela
 Arindoi Bagchi as Jahor
 Diganta Bagchi as Partho
 Anindya Banerjee as Aniruddho Ghosh (Public Prosecutor)
 Joyjit Banerjee as Shyam
 Kamalika Banerjee as Dr. Bonolota Dutta
 Runa Banerjee as Lalita Sen
 Suman Bannerjee as bhoy
 Arghya Basu as Anirban
 Damini Basu as Shiuli
 Tulika Basu as Kasturi Samonto
 Dipanjan Bhattacharya	as Sumit Sanyal
 Joy Bhattacharyya as Bibek
 Titas Bhowmik as Rojoni
 Riju Biswas as Suresh Bagh
 Abhrajit Chakraborty as Shekhar Dasgupta
 Arun Chakraborty as Mike
 Bobby Chakraborty as Ranodeb Burman
 Kaushik Chakraborty as Gautam
 Kushal Chakraborty as Aniruddho Bose
 Subhadra Chakraborty as Madhobi
 Aditi Chatterjee as Shompa Dasgupta
 Bhaswar Chatterjee as Promit Guha
 Debjani Chattopadhyay as Dolon
 Mita Chatterjee as Shushiladebi
 Shubhomoy Chatterjee as Manohor
 Sonali Chowdhury as Ilina Chakraborty
 Dwaipayan Das as Arpan Dutta
 Manali Dey as Gouri
 Debjani Deb as Jonaki
 Pradip Dhar as Prottoy Biswas a.k.a. Potka
 Debolina Dutta as Advocate Ahona Ghosh
 Joymala Ganguly as Nondini Sen
 Pijush Ganguly as Akhil
 Nandini Ghosal as Mrs. Sanyal
 Chandrayee Ghosh as Ananya
 Kaushik Ghosh	as Amit Lahiri
 Pallavi Gogoi	as Marathon Organizer
 Rupsha Guha as Urmi
 Moumita Gupta as Supti Roy Burman
 Dipanwita Hazari as Dr. Debika Sanyal
 Anindita Saha Kapileswari as Sharmila
 Tania Kar as Meghna
 Kalyani Mandal as Mrs. Bonik
 Baisakhi Marjit as Pishimoni
 Rana Mitra as Raju Das
 Rupanjana Mitra as Mohini
 Arpita Mukherjee as Kaushik Mukherjee's wife
 Mrinal Mukherjee as Dip Ganguly
 Neel Mukherjee as Sukanto Choudhury
 Sarbari Mukherjee as Pamela
 Swagata Mukherjee as Mrs. Bagchi
 Piyali Munshi as Indira
 Neel as Anchor Chonchol
 Komal Nishad Mitra as Ayesha
 Manoj Ojha as Shumanto
 Priyam as Indra
 Milon Roychoudhury as Broto
 Shagnik as Rupesh
 Shayanton as Pollob
 Arindam Sil as Mallar
 Lopamudra Sinha as Rupa
 Manasi Sinha as Nondona

Crew

Direction 
Biswajit Ganguly
Ravindra Geetha Nambiar
Ratnodeep Ghosh
Mandira Mitra
Anindya Sarkar
Romit Ojha

Creative Direction 
 Mandira Mitra
Mitali Bhattacharya

Script 
Moushumi Choudhury
Sharmila Mukherjee
Koli Mitra
Shayon Choudhury
Romit Ojha
Saurabh Sengupta
Angikar Choudhury 
Kunal Sengupta

Cinematography 
Rupanjan Pal 	
Kiranmoy Bhuniya

Editing 
 Debashish Bhattacharya 	
 Niladri Dutta

Art Direction 
 Narendra Ojha

Sound Management 
 Ranjan Pandey

Music Department 
Gaurab Chatterjee 	... 	background score / title music composed
Jina 	... 	title music: sung
Jojo 	... 	title music: sung
Chandan Raychowdhury 	... 	musical director / title music composed
Indra Roy 	... 	background score
Srijato 	... 	title music composed

References

External links
 Website
 
2012 Indian television series debuts
2012 Indian television series endings
Star Jalsha original programming
Bengali-language television programming in India